Portland Timbers 2 is an American professional soccer team based in Portland, Oregon. The team, often referred to as "T2", serves as the reserve squad for the Portland Timbers of Major League Soccer (MLS).

The team was a member of the USL Championship from 2015 to 2019, and was in the second tier of the United States soccer pyramid beginning in 2016. The organization withdrew from the 2021 USL Championship season so it could better transfer players to its parent club during the COVID-19 pandemic. The reserves are now part of MLS reserve league MLS Next Pro.

History
The Timbers announced the formation of their USL Pro team at a press conference on October 14, 2014. Jay Vidovich, long-time Wake Forest head coach and two-time NSCAA National Coach of the Year, was hired as T2's head coach on December 18, 2014. Timbers 2 held an open tryout in February 2015. It was announced on February 19 that there are six players currently signed to Timbers 2. Their home games were played at Merlo Field, a soccer-specific stadium at the University of Portland for their first two seasons. After the 2016 season, the Timbers moved T2 home games to Providence Park, and T2 would play there for the next three seasons. After the 2019 season, the Timbers announced that the ownership group of the Hillsboro Hops, a minor-league baseball team based in the Portland suburb of Hillsboro, Oregon, would take over the business operations of T2, while the Timbers would remain T2 owners with responsibility for the playing staff. As part of this agreement, T2 will move to Hillsboro Stadium for 2020 and beyond.

In T2's first season, the team finished in 8th place in the Western Conference of the league table with 11 wins, 15 losses, and 2 ties. Kharlton Belmar was named USL Rookie of the Year and selected for the All-League Second Team. Jay Vidovich resigned to become head coach of the University of Pittsburgh. Assistant Coach Andrew Gregor was hired to replace him on January 6, 2016.

T2 in 2016 had finished in ninth place in the Western Conference. Midway towards the end of the season, T2 had attempted to make a comeback to clinch the final spot for the USL playoffs which increased from the top six to eight teams in each conference. Timbers 2 competed against Arizona United in their final game of their season. Although the team had defeated Arizona, it was not enough to secure the final spot for a  playoff berth due to Orange County winning in their final game with a better goal difference than T2.

In October 2020, T2 announced it would skip the 2021 USL season, aiming to return in 2022.

MLS Next Pro
The club announced on December 6, 2021, that it was joining the inaugural 21-team MLS Next Pro season starting in 2022.

Players and staff

Roster

Staff

Head coaches

Badge and crest
T2's logo contains the same axe that is used in their parent organization's logo. The shape and design were previously used by the Portland Timbers USL franchise.

Record

Year-by-year

Stadium
Merlo Field (2015–2016; 2019)
Providence Park (2017–2019)
Hillsboro Stadium (2020)

References

External links
 
T2: Timbers' new minor-league club offers taste of the past, glimpse of the future - Portland Business Journal
Portland Timbers announce launch of USL PRO team T2 - OregonLive

 
Timbers 2
2014 establishments in Oregon
Association football clubs established in 2014
2
Reserve soccer teams in the United States
MLS Next Pro teams
Former USL Championship teams
Soccer clubs in Oregon